The Whaleman Foundation is a non-profit, marine conservation organization based in Lahaina, Hawaii in the United States.  It advocates for the protection of cetaceans (whales, dolphins, and porpoises) and their habitats.

Whaleman was founded by Jeff Pantukhoff. Hayden Panettiere is the spokesperson for the foundation.   She has promoted the Foundations' Save the Whales Again! campaign since 2008.

References 

Environmental organizations based in Hawaii
Whale conservation